Cambodia has numerous public holidays, including memorial holidays and religious holidays of Buddhist origin. The Khmer traditional calendar, known as  Chântôkôtĕ, is a lunisolar calendar although the word itself means lunar calendar. While the calendar is based on the movement of the moon, calendar dates are also synchronized with the solar year to keep the seasons from drifting.

Therefore, some public holidays are subject to change every year based on the lunar calendar.

Public holidays

Other festivals

References

External links
 Public Holiday Calendar for Civil Servant and Worker for 2017, Royal Government of Cambodia
 2016 Public Holidays, Cambodian Ministry of Foreign Affairs and International Cooperation
 Public Holidays for 2015, Cambodian Embassy in Australia

 
Cambodia